Myriam Merlet (October 14, 1956 – January 12, 2010) was a political activist, scholar and economist who served as Chief of Staff of Haiti's Ministry for Gender and the Rights of Women (Ministère a la Condition Feminine et aux Droits des Femmes (MCFDF)), from 2006 to 2008. One of the particular focuses of her work was on how rape and rape culture is used as a political weapon, and was not considered a criminal offense in Haiti until 2005.

Early life 
Merlet was born in Les Cayes, Haiti. Merlet was the second youngest of six siblings: an older brother and four sisters.

In the 1970s, Merlet left Haiti, growing up in France and Italy.

In 1975, Merlet moved to Montreal, Canada, where she lived for eleven years.

In 1985, while living abroad, she received her M. Sc. in Economics from University of Quebec at Montreal. While at the University of Quebec, she studied women's issues, political sociology, and feminist theory.

Career 
In July 1986, six months after the end of the Jean-Claude Duvalier dictatorship, Merlet returned to Haiti at the age of 29. She wrote a personal essay entitled "The More People Dream" in the collection Walking on Fire: Haitian Women's Stories of Survival and Resistance, where she described her struggles for identity as a Haitian woman living in exile and her desire and decision to be part of the solution, which was part of her motivation to return to Haiti.

Merlet worked to raise the profile of women in Haiti and abroad, founding EnfoFanm, an organization that raises awareness about the challenges facing women in Haiti, and campaigning for several Haitian streets to be named after women.

In 2001 Merlet reached out to Eve Ensler in an effort to bring The Vagina Monologues to Haiti. In 2007, Ensler visited Haiti and performances were held in Port-au-Prince and Cap Haitian.

Vagina Monologue founder, Eve Ensler, wrote a 2011 spotlight monologue entitled "Myriam" as a tribute and rallying cry to the work that Myriam accomplished in Haiti. The monologue describes how Eve called her friend's cellphone, "believing the ring would find you and wake you, your cell gripped in your buried hand."

Merlet participated in the creation and was a longtime spokeswoman for the Coordination Nationale pour le Plaidoyer des Femmes (CONAP), for which she famously battled against sexism in the publicity industry, especially on billboards.

Merlet also played a key role, with other Haitian feminists and members of the government, in helping change the Haitian legal status of rape. Until a new law was pass in 2005, rape was not considered a crime in Haiti, but a public decency offence.

From 2006 to 2008, Merlet was Chief of Staff of Haiti's Ministry for Gender and the Rights of Women (Ministère a la Condition Feminine et aux Droits des Femmes (MCFDF)), and continued as an advisor until her death in 2010.

In 2010, Merlet participated in V-Day's 10-year anniversary, V TO THE TENTH, at the Superdome in New Orleans, where she participated in the parade and gave a talk at the Superlove event called "Power to the Women of Haiti" with fellow activists Elvire Eugene and Ann Valérie Timothée Milfort.

Merlet also led a campaign to name streets after famous Haitian women.

Personal life 
In 2010, Merlet died in the Paco neighborhood of Port-au-Prince, Haiti, as a result of the 2010 Haiti earthquake. After the earthquake, it was reported that she was able to respond and ask for help via mobile phone but rescue was unsuccessful. She was later found trapped in the collapse of her home.

Works and publications 
Chronological by publication

Papers
 Agir sur la Condition Féminine pour améliorer les situations des femmes (with Danièle Magloire) in Cahiers # 8 Conférence Haïtienne des Religieux-euses: Homme et Femme Dieu les créa, du féminisme au partenariat

Open letters
 Forces vives d’Haiti décrétent le Gouvernement Lavalas hors la loi
 Un Antiféminisme Haïtien ? Ou questionnements sur la volonté d’anéantir une pensée Riche et Porteuse

See also 
 Women's rights in Haiti

References

Further reading 
 

1956 births
2010 deaths
Victims of the 2010 Haiti earthquake
Haitian feminists
21st-century Haitian women politicians
21st-century Haitian politicians
Government ministers of Haiti
Women government ministers of Haiti
People from Les Cayes
Université du Québec à Montréal alumni